The Human Factor is the fourth album by American heavy metal band Metal Church, released in 1991. It was the band's only release on Epic Records.

Reception

Reviews for The Human Factor have been generally positive. In a contemporary review, Rock Hard elected The Human Factor "power metal highlight of the month" and valued its sound "rounder and more energetic than Blessing in Disguise", praising all musicians and singer Mike Howe in particular. AllMusic's Alex Henderson wrote that "much of the writing is quite substantial, and Metal Church tackles social and political subjects with inspired results on songs ranging from 'Date with Poverty' and 'Flee from Reality' to 'The Final Word' (which addresses the flag-burning controversy of 1991 and asserts that the U.S., whatever its faults, is still the best place to live)." Canadian journalist Martin Popoff considered the album the band's masterwork and put Metal Church on a par with Megadeth as "metal perfection personified". He praised the "maturity and sensitivity" of the lyrics, Mark Dodson's production and Mike Howe's performance, defining the songs "without exception infectious and unstoppable."

Although The Human Factor sold well at the time of its release, it turned out to be one of Metal Church's least successful albums, not appearing on any album charts. In order to promote The Human Factor, Metal Church supported Motörhead, Judas Priest, Dangerous Toys and Alice Cooper on the Operation Rock 'N' Roll tour, and later supported Metallica on the Wherever We May Roam Tour.

In 2005, the album was ranked number 447 in Rock Hard magazine's book of The 500 Greatest Rock & Metal Albums of All Time.

Track listing

Personnel
Metal Church
Mike Howe – vocals
Craig Wells – lead guitar
John Marshall – rhythm guitar
Duke Erickson – bass
Kirk Arrington – drums

Production
Mark Dodson – producer, engineer, arrangements with Kurdt Vanderhoof and Metal Church
Tom Fletcher – mixing
Greg Calbi – mastering at Sterling Sound, New York
Kenny Laguna – management 
Christopher Austopchuk, Francesca Restrepo – art direction
Max Aguilera-Hellweg – photography

References

1991 albums
Metal Church albums
Albums produced by Mark Dodson
Epic Records albums